The 2nd Bordeaux Grand Prix was a non-championship Formula Two motor race held on 3 May 1953 on a street circuit centred around the Place des Quinconces in Bordeaux, Gironde, France. The Grand Prix was won by Alberto Ascari in a Ferrari 500. Ascari's teammate Luigi Villoresi, starting from pole, was second. Juan Manuel Fangio, in a one-off drive in a Gordini Type 16 at the personal invitation of Amédée Gordini, was third. Giuseppe Farina set fastest lap in another Ferrari 500 but retired with gearbox problems.

Classification

Race

References

Bordeaux
Bordeaux
Bordeaux